is a science fiction magazine published by Hayakawa Shobō in Japan. It was Japan’s first successful science fiction prozine.

History

S-F Magazine was established in 1960. It began publication with the February 1960 issue, which appeared in bookshops in December 1959. The magazine was established by Masami Fukushima. It was also first edited by him. 

He was the editor for nearly a decade, being succeeded by Masaru Mori in 1969. At first the magazine published translations of English language science fiction stories. Later the magazine began publishing original fiction by Japanese authors.

S-F Magazine was published on a monthly basis. It became a bimonthly publication from the April 2015 issue.

Awards
S-F Magazine has conducted  where the magazine’s readers vote annually for best foreign short story, best Japanese short story and best illustrator from their issues in the previous year since 1989.

It also held  during 1962-1992 and resumed in 2013, a prize for unpublished works to recruit new writers.

Famous contributors

Brian Aldiss
J. G. Ballard
Greg Bear
Ted Chiang
Samuel R. Delany
Greg Egan
Bruce Sterling
James Tiptree, Jr.
Cordwainer Smith
Kurt Vonnegut
Izumi Suzuki

See also
Japanese science fiction

References

1960 establishments in Japan
Bi-monthly magazines
Magazines established in 1960
Science fiction magazines established in the 1960s
Science fiction magazines published in Japan
Magazines published in Tokyo
Monthly magazines published in Japan